The , formerly known as  before 2017, is a Go competition for female Go players. The tournament was introduced in 2014.

Outline
The Hollyhock Cup is sponsored by the Aizu Central Hospital, a hospital in Aizuwakamatsu City in Fukushima Prefecture, and named after the city flower, 	the common hollyhock (Althaea rosea). The director of the hospital is a keen go player, and in an interview he said that at one time 20 of the doctors on the staff were go players who often held their own tournaments. His aim in sponsoring the tournament is to help raise the level of Japanese women so that they can compete better internationally. The winner's purse is 7,000,000 yen ($60,000). The first three cycles used one final game over the course of two days. Starting from the fourth cycle, the final is a three-games match. Starting from the fifth cycle, a challenger system is set to be implemented, meaning the winner of the previous cycle will play in a title series against the challenger.

Past winners

References

External links
 Nihon Ki-in archive (in Japanese)

Go competitions in Japan